John Wynne (born February 8, 1971) is a Canadian retired professional ice hockey defenceman.

Career 
Wynne played with Canada men's national ice hockey team during the 1994–95 season. He then attended the University of Waterloo, where he excelled on the ice with the college team. He was awarded the Senator Joseph A. Sullivan Trophy as the CIAU Player of the Year for the 1995–96 season.

Awards and honors

See also
 List of University of Waterloo people

References

External links

1971 births
Living people
Canadian ice hockey defencemen
Detroit Compuware Ambassadors players
Fresno Falcons players
Asiago Hockey 1935 players
New Mexico Scorpions (WPHL) players
Sheffield Steelers players
Ice hockey people from Calgary
Canadian expatriate ice hockey players in England
Canadian expatriate ice hockey players in Italy
Canadian expatriate ice hockey players in the United States